

Hubert Weise (22 December 1884 – 14 February 1950) was a German general  (Generaloberst) in the Luftwaffe during World War II.  He was a recipient of the Knight's Cross of the Iron Cross of Nazi Germany. Weise surrendered to the Allied troops in May 1945 and was released in 1947.

Awards and decorations

 German Cross in Gold on 14 January 1944 as Generaloberst and Luftwaffe Befehlshaber Mitte (Luftwaffe Commander Central)
 Knight's Cross of the Iron Cross on 24 June 1940 as General der Flakartillerie and commander of I. Flak-Korps

References

Citations

Bibliography

 
 
 

1884 births
1950 deaths
Military personnel from Erfurt
People from the Province of Saxony
German Army personnel of World War I
Luftwaffe World War II generals
Recipients of the clasp to the Iron Cross, 1st class
Recipients of the Gold German Cross
Recipients of the Knight's Cross of the Iron Cross
German prisoners of war in World War II
Prussian Army personnel
Reichswehr personnel
Colonel generals of the Luftwaffe
20th-century Freikorps personnel